Miguel Mora Morales (born 3 June 1974) is a Spanish former footballer who played as a goalkeeper.

Club career
Born in Barcelona, Catalonia, Mora was an unsuccessful FC Barcelona youth graduate, spent his first professional years with modest clubs, also mostly in his native region. His biggest success was appearing in 27 matches in 1998–99's second division, with UE Lleida.

Mora moved to neighbouring Portugal in January 2001, first with another lowly side, Madeira's C.F. União. For the 2003–04 season he joined Rio Ave F.C. of the Primeira Liga, and was the Vila do Conde team's first choice for the vast majority of his lengthy spell.

In 2007–08, Rio Ave returned from the second tier but Mora only managed to be backup in the following two top-flight campaigns, successively to Márcio Paiva and Carlos Fernandes, playing a total of four games. He retired in June 2010, at the age of 36.

References

External links

1974 births
Living people
Footballers from Barcelona
Spanish footballers
Association football goalkeepers
Segunda División players
Segunda División B players
Tercera División players
UE Lleida players
CF Balaguer footballers
CF Gavà players
CD Binéfar players
CD Badajoz players
Primeira Liga players
Liga Portugal 2 players
Segunda Divisão players
C.F. União players
Rio Ave F.C. players
Spanish expatriate footballers
Expatriate footballers in Portugal
Spanish expatriate sportspeople in Portugal